The Reid House at 1325-1327 Peachtree St., NE, in Atlanta, Georgia, known also as Garrison Apartments (during 1924–26) and as 1325 Apartments (during 1926–74), was built as a luxury apartment building in 1924.  It was the third luxury apartment building built in Atlanta.  It received a $2 million renovation during 1974 and was converted to a luxury condominium building in 1975.  The ten-story building was designed by architect Philip T. Shutze of architectural firm Hentz, Reid and Adler in Classical Revival architecture.  The 1974 renovation was by architect Eugene I. Lowry.

There are four stacks of apartments, and each stack has the same, unique floor plan.  The building is divided in two halves so that each stack shares a formal elevator lobby with only the apartment across the elevator lobby--semi-private.  This building is a rare example in Atlanta of a Manhattan style "classic six and classic eight" pre-war apartment building.

It was listed on the National Register of Historic Places in 1979.  The NRHP nomination lists 24 units;  it has also been described as having 40 units.

Reid House, or at least some part of it, has also been described as being designed by Neel Reid.  It is located across Peachtree Street from the High Museum of Art.

References

5.  "For an Atlanta Home of a Certain Age, a Design With Patina" https://www.nytimes.com/2019/02/26/realestate/for-an-atlanta-home-of-a-certain-age-a-design-with-patina.html New York Times. Feb. 26, 2019

6.  Dowling, Elizabeth Meredith.  American Classicist: The Architecture of Philip Trammell Shutze.  New York: Rizzoli, 1989.

7.  Mitchell, William R.  J. Neel Reid Architect. of Hentz, Reid & Adler and the Georgia School of Classicists.  Atlanta: The Georgia Trust for Historic Preservation, 1997.

8.  Mitchell, William R. and Van Jones Martin.  Classic Atlanta: Landmarks of the Atlanta Spirit.  New Orleans: Martin-St. Martin, 1991.

External links
The Reid House, at an Atlanta condos website, with pictures

Apartment buildings in Atlanta
National Register of Historic Places in Atlanta
Neoclassical architecture in Georgia (U.S. state)
Residential buildings completed in 1924
Residential buildings on the National Register of Historic Places in Georgia (U.S. state)